Ambrogio Crotti (also known as "Amadeus") is an Italian musician, arranger, composer and producer.

Biography
After a long life as a musician touring around the world, he started his studio career in Studio 33 in Hamburg, Germany, where he worked together with Luis Rodriguez and Dieter Bohlen. After 22 years with the Team 33, he currently lives in Mallorca and working as a freelance producer.

Discography
His long discography includes big names of the music business such as Modern Talking, Fun Factory, David Tavaré, Matthias Reim.

Here is a selection of his works:

References

Year of birth missing (living people)
Living people
Italian composers
Italian record producers